Hans Nilsson may refer to:

Hans Nilsson (musician) (born 1972), Swedish drummer
Hans Nilsson (canoeist) (born 1946), Swedish sprint canoer
Hans Nilsson (footballer) (born 1941), Swedish footballer and bandy player

See also
Hans Nilsen
Hans Nielsen (disambiguation)